Medical eponyms are terms used in medicine which are named after people (and occasionally places or things). In 1975, the Canadian National Institutes of Health held a conference that discussed the naming of diseases and conditions.  This was reported in The Lancet where the conclusion was summarized as: "The possessive use of an eponym should be discontinued, since the author neither had nor owned the disorder." 
New discoveries are often attached to the people who made the discovery because of the nature of the history of medicine.

 List of eponymous diseases
 List of eponymous fractures
 List of eponymous medical signs
 List of eponymous surgical procedures
 List of eponymous tests
 List of human anatomical parts named after people
 List of eponymous medical devices
 List of eponymous medical treatments
 List of medical eponyms with Nazi associations
 List of orthopaedic eponyms
 List of eponyms in neuroscience, neurology and neurosurgery

References

External links
 WhoNamedIt.com, a dictionary of medical eponyms.
 MedEponyms.com, a dictionary of pathology eponyms.

Eponyms
Medical terminology
medical eponyms